The Istana Perlis is the official city-residence of His Majesty, the Raja of Perlis and the royal family, in Kuala Lumpur. It is located at Jalan Tun Razak, close to the Royal Selangor Golf Club. Next to it is the Istana Terengganu. Currently the palace stands empty, pending renovation.

External links

Buildings and structures in Kuala Lumpur
Royal residences in Malaysia
Palaces in Malaysia